Sikka is a regency within East Nusa Tenggara province, Indonesia, on the island of Flores. It covers an area of 1,731.91 km2 and had a population of 300,301 at the 2010 census and 321,953 at the 2020 Census; the official estimate as at mid 2021 was 324,252. The capital is the town of Maumere, which comprises the districts of Alok Barat, Alok and Alok Timur (although the last two also include a number of notable islands to the north of Flores).

Administrative districts 
The regency is divided into twenty-one districts (kecamatan), tabulated below with their areas and their populations at the 2010 census and the 2020 census. The table also includes the locations of the district administrative centres, the number of villages (rural desa and urban kelurahan) in each district, and its post code.

Note: (a) Palu'e is an island district, situated off the north coast of Flores. (b) includes the offshore islands of Pulau Pamana Besar and Pulau Pamana Kecil (with a combined population of 4,268 in mid 2021) and, further north, Pulau Sukun or Samparong (with a population of 1,532 in mid 2021). (c) includes the offshore islands of Pulau Koja  or Pulau Besar (with 2,960 inhabitants in mid 2021), Pulau Parumaan (with 1,816 inhabitants in mid 2021) comprising Pulau Pangabatan, Pulau Mermaan and Pulau Damhila, and Pulau Babi.

See also
 Palu island
 Rokatenda
 Maumere
 1992 Flores earthquake and tsunami
 Babi Island

References

Flores Island (Indonesia)
Regencies of East Nusa Tenggara